

Newcastle Knights Club Records

General Records
Year Entered Premiership: 1988

First Match: March 5, 1988 - Lost 4-28 v  Parramatta Eels, Newcastle International Sports Centre

Home Ground: McDonald Jones Stadium (formerly known as Newcastle International Sports Centre, Marathon Stadium, EnergyAustralia Stadium, Ausgrid Stadium and Hunter Stadium)

Capacity: 33,000

First Grade Premierships: 2 - 1997 (ARL), 2001

Finals Series: 15 - 1992, 1995, 1997, 1998, 1999, 2000, 2001, 2002, 2003, 2006, 2009, 2011, 2013, 2020, 2021

Wooden Spoons: 4 - 2005, 2015, 2016, 2017

Top Home Attendances:

Top Attendance:

Individual Records

Career

Most First Grade Games
257, Danny Buderus (1997–2008, 2012–2013)
251, Kurt Gidley (2001–2015)
249, Andrew Johns (1993–2007)
229, Tony Butterfield (1988–2000)
223, Robbie O'Davis (1992–2004)
221, Matt Gidley (1996–2006)
216, Steve Simpson (1999–2010)
211, Jarrod Mullen (2005–2016)
190, Bill Peden (1994–2002)
188, Marc Glanville (1988–1997)

Most Points For Club
2,176 (80 tries, 917 goals, 22 field goals), Andrew Johns (1993–2007)
1,228 (80 tries, 452 goals, 4 field goals), Kurt Gidley (2001–2015)
440 (110 tries), Akuila Uate (2008–2016)
432 (38 tries, 140 goals), Kalyn Ponga (2018–)
410 (21 tries, 163 goals), Tyrone Roberts (2011–2015)
403 (78 tries, 45 goals, 1 field goal), Robbie O'Davis (1992–2004)

Most Tries For Club
110, Akuila Uate (2008–2016)
93, Timana Tahu (1999–2004, 2012–2014)
87, Adam MacDougall (1997–2003, 2007 –2011)
80, Andrew Johns (1993–2007)
80, Kurt Gidley (2001–2015)
78, Robbie O'Davis (1992–2004)
72, James McManus (2007–2015)
68, Matt Gidley (1996–2006)
66, Mark Hughes (1997–2005)
65, Darren Albert (1996–2001)

Season

Most Points

Most Tries

Match

Most Points in a Match

Most Tries in a Match

Most Goals in a Match

Club Records

Alltime Wins & Losses Record
Note:
28 of the 800 games were in the finals (13 wins, 15 losses)

Last updated on 5 October 2020. Stats accurate by the end of the 2020 NRL season.

Biggest Wins

Highest Scores

Biggest Losses

Highest Scores Conceded

Streaks
Longest Winning Streaks:
 11 (August 25, 2001 to April 19, 2002)
 9 (March 11, 1995 to May 7, 1995)
 8 (June 9, 1990 to July 29, 1990)
 8 (March 25, 2001 to May 19, 2001)
 7 (September 20, 1997 to April 10, 1998)

Longest Home Win Streaks:
 9 (July 27, 2008 to May 31, 2009)
 8 (March 19, 1995 to July 9, 1995)

Longest Losing Streaks:
 19 (April 16, 2016 to March 5, 2017)
 13 (March 13, 2005 to June 19, 2005)
 8 (May 21, 2017 to July 21, 2017)
 7 (June 16, 1991 to July 28, 1991)
 7 (July 17, 1994 to August 26, 1994)
 7 (July 16, 2007 to August 24, 2007)
 7 (April 18, 2014 to June 24, 2014)
 7 (March 18, 2017 to April 29, 2017)

Comebacks
Biggest Comeback
Trailed an 18-point deficit.
 Trailed  Parramatta Eels 18-0 after 18 minutes to win 28-20 at SFS (September 7, 1997)
 Trailed  Brisbane Broncos 22-4 after 44 minutes to win 26-22 at Marathon Stadium (June 4, 2000)
 Trailed  Cronulla Sharks 18-0 after 38 minutes to win 31-18 at Remondis Stadium (July 13, 2014)

Worst Collapse
Surrendered a 24-point lead.
Led  Wests Tigers 24-0 after 26 minutes to lose 36-32 at Campbelltown Stadium (August 11, 2001)

Home Crowds 1988-2021

1996: 10 home games played due to  Cronulla's forfeit in Round 1 during the Super League strike.

1998: 26,482 at home final vs.  Sydney City

2000: 20,597 at home final vs.  Melbourne

2001: 22,061 at home final vs.  Sydney Roosters

2002: 21,051 at home final vs.  St. George Illawarra

2006: 23,752 at home final vs.  Manly

2020: Due to the COVID-19 crisis, not all home crowd figures were available for corresponding season

2021: Due to the COVID-19 crisis in NSW, only 9 games were played at McDonald Jones Stadium as the competition was moved to Queensland

Representatives

Awards and achievements

Records
National Rugby League lists
Australian records
Rugby league records and statistics
New South Wales-related lists